This article concerns the period 889 BC – 880 BC.

Events and trends
 887 BC—Soshenq II succeeds Osorkon I as king of Egypt.
885 BC—Takelot I succeeds Soshenq II as king of Egypt.
885 BC—King Yi of Zhou, son of King Yih, is restored to the throne.
885 BC—Zimri king of Israel assasinates Elah and rules for 7 days. After suiciding, The people picks Omri as their king while others pick Tibni.
 883 BC—Ashurnasirpal II succeeds his father Tukulti-Ninurta II as king of Assyria.
 881 BC—Tibni the son of Ginath dies and Omri succeeds him.
 880 BC—Ashurnasirpal moves the Assyrian royal capital to Kalhu (modern Nimrud, Iraq). Human-headed winged lion (lamassu) gateway supports from the palace date from this period to 859 BC.

Significant people
 Shalmaneser III, king of Assyria, is born (approximate date).
 Ahaziah, king of Israel, is born (approximate date).
 Jehoram, king of Judah, is born (approximate date).

References